Satish Chakravarthy is an Indian music composer, who mainly produces film scores and soundtracks in the Tamil film industry. He composed music for the films, Leelai and Kanimozhi.

Career
Satish Chakravarthy graduated from the National Institute of Technology, Tiruchirappalli as an engineer, and then attended Berklee College of Music in Massachusetts where he worked with A. R. Rahman beginning in 2006 on several films as a musician.  He then began a music career composing Leelai.

He was approached by T. Siva, a close family friend, to produce Kanimozhi. Siva's first production had music scored by Satish's father.

Discography

References

External links

Year of birth missing (living people)
Living people
Tamil musicians
Tamil film score composers
National Institute of Technology, Tiruchirappalli alumni
Berklee College of Music alumni
Musicians from Chennai